The Man Who Invented Christmas is a 2017 Christmas biographical comedy-drama film directed by Bharat Nalluri and written by Susan Coyne. Based on the 2008 book of the same name about Charles Dickens by Les Standiford, the joint Canadian and Irish production stars Dan Stevens, Christopher Plummer, and Jonathan Pryce, and follows Dickens (Stevens) as he conceives and writes his 1843 novella A Christmas Carol.

The film was produced by Parallel Film and Rhombus Media. It was released by Bleecker Street in the United States on 22 November 2017, and by Thunderbird Releasing in the United Kingdom on 1 December 2017. It received generally positive reviews from critics.

Plot 
In 1843, four years after the success of Oliver Twist, Charles Dickens (Dan Stevens) is suffering financial hardship from the failure of his last three books. Rejected by his publishers, he sets out to write a new book, and publish it himself, to restore his finances. Seeing inspiration around London, most notably a rich man's funeral that is largely unattended and a mean-spirited old man who gives him the catchphrase "Humbug" and inspiration of a new character, he begins writing A Christmas Carol, due in six weeks in order to be published by Christmas, despite his friends and publishers telling him that the book will also be a failure as Christmas (at the time) was considered irrelevant and few people celebrated it.

As Charles develops the story, he interacts with the characters that manifest in front of him, most notably Ebenezer Scrooge (Christopher Plummer). Dickens is helped by one of his servants, Tara (Anna Murphy), a literate Irish nursemaid to his children, whom he discusses story elements with.

While writing his book, Charles is greeted by the unannounced arrival of his eccentric father, John Dickens (Jonathan Pryce), whom Charles views as immature and fiscally irresponsible. When Charles shows Tara the next draft, she is distraught that Scrooge would not save Tiny Tim. Tara believes that people can change and suggests instead that Scrooge saves Tiny Tim.

However, Charles is unable to believe that a man as cruel and cold as Scrooge could change. He rejects the notion but it continues to haunt him in the form of writer's block. Charles' relationship with his family and friends increasingly strains as he struggles with Scrooge's ending and his debts mount, until he sends both his parents and Tara out of the house in a fit of rage. The next morning, he regrets dismissing Tara, but is unable to find and rehire her. His wife, Catherine Dickens, tearfully confronts Charles over his recklessness and instability, and admits that she believes that he puts his work before his own family.

It is revealed that much of Charles' animosity toward his father stems from his childhood trauma of laboring in a blacking factory after his family was taken to debtors' prison, all due to John Dickens' failure to pay his debts. Returning to the long-abandoned factory, Charles is forced to confront his own insecurities through Scrooge. Charles realizes that his story should be one of redemption and races home to finish his manuscript. As he is about to leave his home to submit it to his printer, he finds that Tara has come to return a book that he had lent her, and he apologizes for his angry outburst and invites her back to the household.

His wife suggests that he do the same with his father, who is about to board a train to leave London. He does so and, after reconnecting with his family, submits the manuscript in time for publishing before Christmas.

The Dickens family celebrates the holiday, while a text epilogue explains the overnight success of A Christmas Carol and its lasting impact on the Christmas holiday.

Cast

Production 
In addition to filming at Ardmore studios in Wicklow in Ireland, location filming was completed in and around Dublin (including Henrietta Street and North Great Georges Street) as well as in Wicklow; the latter was "transformed into 1840’s Victorian England" according to one source. Principal photography was completed on 21 January 2017.

Historical accuracy 
Dickens is shown visiting Warren's Blacking Factory as an adult, but this building was demolished in the early 1830s.

In an interview, Stevens said of the film's historical accuracy: “Frankly, whether it’s historically accurate, I’m not that concerned about. I was interested in that moment of the creative process, watching a great man struggle – to me, that's dramatically and comedically interesting. Certainly, I was keen not to play Dickens as a bearded old sage”. He also expressed an interest in Miriam Margolyes' theory that Dickens was bipolar, saying: “There were moments when he was bleak and depressive. But I think there were moments when he was great fun to be around, very silly and playful.”

In a review, Time magazine mentioned that "some major plot points are the product of dramatic license" but concluded that the film "does provide viewers with a fairly accurate sense of how Dickens successfully changed the way Christmas is celebrated".

Release and reception 

The film was released in the United States in 500 theaters on 22 November 2017.

Critical response 

On Rotten Tomatoes, the film has an approval rating of 79% based on 174 reviews, with an average rating of 6.40/10. The website's critical consensus reads, "The Man Who Invented Christmas adds holiday magic to the writing of A Christmas Carol, putting a sweetly revisionist spin on the story behind a classic yuletide tale." On Metacritic, the film has a weighted average score 60 out of 100, based on reviews from 32 critics, indicating "mixed or average reviews".

Peter Debruge of Variety wrote: "In addition to being a rather fine addition to the Christmas-movie canon, the film marks a useful teaching tool — a better option for classroom screenings than any of the previous "Carol" adaptations, once students have finished reading the novella." Peter Bradshaw of The Guardian was less impressed, giving it one star and calling it "a kind of wacky and saccharine muttonchop-whisker-gawd-bless-yer fantasy-comedy". He thought Stevens was miscast, and that "Not even a good cast can help a film as tin-eared as this."

Accolades 
It was nominated on 27 June 2018 at the 44th Saturn Awards for Best International Film.

See also 
 List of Christmas films

References

External links 
 
 
 
 The Man Who Invented Christmas at History vs. Hollywood

2017 films
Bleecker Street films
English-language Canadian films
Films directed by Bharat Nalluri
Films scored by Mychael Danna
Films set in 1843
Cultural depictions of Charles Dickens
Films about writers
Works about Charles Dickens
2017 biographical drama films
English-language Irish films
2010s Christmas films
2017 drama films
Canadian Christmas drama films
2010s English-language films
2010s Canadian films